Soo Line 1003 is a class "L-1" 2-8-2 "Mikado" type steam locomotive built by the American Locomotive Company (ALCO) in March 1913 as a member of the Minneapolis, St. Paul and Sault Ste. Marie Railroad ("Soo Line") L-1 class. It was retired from regular revenue service in August 1959 and restored to operating condition on October 27, 1996. Today, it is occasionally operated on the major railroads of the American Upper Midwest.

History

Revenue service 
The locomotive was built in 1913 by the American Locomotive Company (ALCO). It was used by the Soo Line until retirement in August 1959, when it went into serviceable storage in Gladstone, Michigan as part of the railroad's strategic reserve. On December 30, 1959, the railroad donated the locomotive to the city of Superior, Wisconsin where it was put on public display. In the mid 1970s, Superior Shortline Steam Railroad Ltd. was organized to restore the locomotive to operations.

Excursion service 
The locomotive was sold partially disassembled in 1993 to Wisconsin Railway Preservation Trust (WRPT), another organization whose goal was to return the locomotive to operations. WRPT raised $250,000 for the locomotive's restoration. It was originally hoped that the locomotive could be used for excursion trips on the weekend of October 5, 1996, but boiler tests showed the engine to not be ready in time.

No. 1003's first run after restoration under its own power occurred on October 27, 1996, when it steamed up the Duluth, Missabe and Iron Range Railway's Proctor Hill. It performed a few more test runs before its first public excursion in 1997. In 1998 it ran the "triple-header" excursion with Northern Pacific 328 and Soo Line 2719.

The locomotive made its final journey under its FRA-mandated 15-year boiler certificate on November 13, 2010. But shortly afterwards, the operators raised funds to have the engine overhauled and certified for another 15 years of operation. No. 1003 returned to service in September 2012, but flue problems delayed its first excursion run until November 2014.

See also 

 Chicago and North Western 1385
 Polson Logging Co. 2
 Soo Line 2713
 Soo Line 2718
 Union Pacific 618

References

External links 

 Steam Locomotive Heritage Association website

1003
ALCO locomotives
2-8-2 locomotives
Individual locomotives of the United States
Railway locomotives introduced in 1913
Standard gauge locomotives of the United States
Preserved steam locomotives of Wisconsin